Edward Paul Abbey (January 29, 1927 – March 14, 1989) was an American author, essayist, and environmental activist noted for his advocacy of environmental issues and criticism of public land policies. His best-known works include Desert Solitaire, a non-fiction autobiographical account of his time as a park ranger at Arches National Park considered to be an iconic work of nature writing and a staple of early environmentalist writing; the novel The Monkey Wrench Gang, which has been cited as an inspiration by environmentalists; his novel Hayduke Lives!; and his essay collections Down the River (with Henry Thoreau & Other Friends) (1982) and One Life at a Time, Please (1988).

Early life and education
Abbey was born in Indiana, Pennsylvania, (although another source names his birthplace as Home, Pennsylvania) on January 29, 1927 to Mildred Postlewait and Paul Revere Abbey. Mildred was a schoolteacher and a church organist, and gave Abbey an appreciation for classical music and literature. Paul was a farmer, as well as a socialist, anarchist, and atheist whose views strongly influenced Abbey.

Abbey graduated from high school in Indiana, Pennsylvania, in 1945. Eight months before his 18th birthday, when he was faced with being drafted into the U.S. Military, Abbey decided to explore the American southwest. He traveled by foot, bus, hitchhiking, and freight train hopping. During this trip, he fell in love with the desert country of the Four Corners region. Abbey wrote:
"[...]crags and pinnacles of naked rock, the dark cores of ancient volcanoes, a vast and silent emptiness smoldering with heat, color, and indecipherable significance, above which floated a small number of pure, clear, hard-edged clouds. For the first time, I felt I was getting close to the West of my deepest imaginings, the place where the tangible and the mythical became the same."

In the military, Abbey had applied for a clerk typist position but instead served two years as a military police officer in Italy. Abbey was promoted in the military twice but, due to his knack for opposing authority, was twice demoted and was honorably discharged as a private. His experience with the military left him with a distrust for large institutions and regulations which influenced his writing throughout his career, and strengthened his radical beliefs.

When he returned to the United States, Abbey took advantage of the G.I. Bill to attend the University of New Mexico, where he received a B.A. in philosophy and English in 1951, and a master's degree in philosophy in 1956. During his time in college, Abbey supported himself by working at a variety of odd jobs, including being a newspaper reporter and bartending in Taos, New Mexico.

During this time, he had few male friends but had intimate relationships with a number of women. Shortly before getting his bachelor's degree, Abbey married his first wife, Jean Schmechal, also a UNM student.

While an undergraduate, Abbey was the editor of a student newspaper in which he published an article titled "Some Implications of Anarchy". A cover quotation of the article (from Denis Diderot, ironically attributed to Louisa May Alcott), stated: "Man will never be free until the last king is strangled with the entrails of the last priest." University officials seized all of the copies of the issue and removed Abbey from the editorship of the paper.

Upon receiving his honorable discharge papers, Abbey sent them back to the department with the words "Return to Sender". The FBI took note and added a note to his file which was opened in 1947 when Edward Abbey committed an act of civil disobedience: he posted a letter while in college urging people to rid themselves of their draft cards. Abbey was on the FBI's watch-list ever since then and was watched throughout his life. In 1952, Abbey wrote a letter against the draft in times of peace, and again the FBI took notice writing, "Edward Abbey is against war and military." Throughout Abbey's life the FBI took notes building a profile on Abbey, observing his movements, and interviewing many people who knew him. Towards the later part  of his life Abbey learned of the FBI's interest in him and said, "I'd be insulted if they weren't watching me."

After graduating, Schmechal and Abbey traveled together to Edinburgh, Scotland, where Abbey spent a year at Edinburgh University as a Fulbright scholar. During this time, Abbey and Schmechal separated and ended their marriage. In 1951, Abbey began an affair with artist Rita Deanin, who in 1952 would become his second wife after he and Schmechal divorced. Deanin and Abbey had two children, Joshua N. Abbey and Aaron Paul Abbey.

Abbey's master's thesis explored anarchism and the morality of violence, asking the two questions: "To what extent is the current association between anarchism and violence warranted?" and "In so far as the association is a valid one, what arguments have the anarchists presented, explicitly or implicitly, to justify the use of violence?" After receiving his master's degree, Abbey spent 1957 at Stanford University on a Wallace Stegner Creative Writing Fellowship.

Work for National Park Service

In 1956 and 1957, Abbey worked as a seasonal ranger for the United States National Park Service at Arches National Monument (now a national park), near the town of Moab, Utah. Abbey held the position from April to September each year, during which time he maintained trails, greeted visitors, and collected campground fees. He lived in a house trailer that had been provided to him by the Park Service, as well as in a ramada that he built himself. During his stay at Arches, Abbey accumulated a large volume of notes and sketches which later formed the basis of his first non-fiction work, Desert Solitaire. Abbey's second son Aaron was born in 1959, in Albuquerque, New Mexico.

In 1961, the movie version of his second novel, The Brave Cowboy, with screenplay by Dalton Trumbo, was being shot on location in New Mexico by Kirk Douglas who had purchased the novel's screen rights and was producing and starring in the film, released in 1962 as Lonely Are the Brave. Douglas once said that when Abbey visited the film set, he looked and talked so much like Douglas' friend Gary Cooper that Douglas was disconcerted. Nonetheless, over 25 years later when Abbey died, Douglas wrote that he had "never met" Abbey.  In 1981, Abbey's third novel, Fire on the Mountain, was also adapted into a TV movie by the same title.

On October 16, 1965, Abbey married Judy Pepper, who accompanied him as a seasonal park ranger in the Florida Everglades and then as a fire lookout in Lassen Volcanic National Park. Judy was separated from Abbey for extended periods of time while she attended the University of Arizona to earn her master's degree. During this time, Abbey had relations with other women—something that Judy gradually became aware of, causing their marriage to suffer. On August 8, 1968, Judy gave birth to a daughter, Susannah "Susie" Mildred Abbey. Ed purchased the family a home in Sabino Canyon, outside of Tucson. Judy died of leukemia on July 11, 1970, an event that crushed Abbey, causing him to go into "bouts of depression and loneliness" for years. It was to Judy that he dedicated his book Black Sun. However, the book was not an autobiographical novel about his relationship with Judy. Rather, it was a story about a woman with whom Abbey had an affair in 1963. Abbey finished the first draft of Black Sun in 1968, two years before Judy died, and it was "a bone of contention in their marriage."

Desert Solitaire, Abbey's fourth book and first non-fiction work, was published in 1968. In it, he describes his stay in the canyonlands of southeastern Utah from 1956 to 1957.

In 1973, Abbey married his fourth wife, Renee Downing. However, with Abbey frequently away, they divorced four years later.

Later life
Abbey met his fifth and final wife, Clarke Cartwright, in 1978, and married her in 1982. Together they had two children, Rebecca Claire Abbey and Benjamin C. Abbey.

In 1984, Abbey went back to the University of Arizona to teach courses in creative writing and hospitality management. During this time, he continued working on his book Fool's Progress.

In July 1987, Abbey went to the Earth First! Rendezvous at the North Rim of the Grand Canyon. While there, he was involved in a heated debate with an anarchist communist group known as Alien Nation, over his stated view that America should be closed to all immigration. Abbey devoted an entire chapter in his book Hayduke Lives! to the events that took place at the Rendezvous. In autumn of 1987, the Utne Reader published a letter by Murray Bookchin which claimed that Abbey, Garrett Hardin, and the members of Earth First! were racists and eco-terrorists. Regarding the accusation of "eco-terrorism", Abbey responded that the tactics he supported were trying to defend against the terrorism he felt was committed by government and industry against living beings and the environment.

Death and burial

Abbey died on March 14, 1989, aged 62, in his home in Tucson, Arizona. His death was due to complications from surgery; he suffered four days of bleeding into his esophagus due to varices caused by portal hypertension, a consequence of end stage liver cirrhosis. Showing his sense of humor, he left a message for anyone who asked about his final words: "No comment." Abbey also left instructions on what to do with his remains: Abbey wanted his body transported in the bed of a pickup truck and wished to be buried as soon as possible. He did not want to be embalmed or placed in a coffin. Instead, he preferred to be placed inside of an old sleeping bag and requested that his friends disregard all state laws concerning burial. "I want my body to help fertilize the growth of a cactus or cliff rose or sagebrush or tree," said the message. For his funeral, Abbey stated, "No formal speeches desired, though the deceased will not interfere if someone feels the urge. But keep it all simple and brief." He requested gunfire and bagpipe music, a cheerful and raucous wake, "[a]nd a flood of beer and booze! Lots of singing, dancing, talking, hollering, laughing, and lovemaking."

A 2003 Outside article described how his friends honored his request:

Abbey's body was buried in the Cabeza Prieta Desert in Pima County, Arizona, where "you'll never find it." The friends carved a marker on a nearby stone, reading:

Abbey is survived by two daughters, Susannah and Rebecca, and three sons, Joshua, Aaron, and Benjamin.

Documentaries 
 Wrenched, by Jerome filmmaker ML Lincoln is a 2013 documentary film that picks up where Edward Abbey's iconic novel The Monkey Wrench Gang left off, chronicling Abbey's legacy of environmental civil disobedience. This was originally called "Lines Across The Sand".
 Edward Abbey: A Voice in the Wilderness is a 1993 PBS documentary by Eric Temple.
 The Cracking of Glen Canyon Damn – with Edward Abbey and Earth First!(1982) captured the legendary first action of radical desert rats when they dropped a 300-foot-long black plastic "crack" over the dam and called poetically for its demise. Produced by Toby McLeod, Glenn Switkes and Randy Hayes.

Literature

Abbey's literary influences included Aldo Leopold, Henry David Thoreau, Gary Snyder, Peter Kropotkin, and A. B. Guthrie, Jr. Although often compared to authors like Thoreau or Aldo Leopold, Abbey did not wish to be known as a nature writer, saying that he didn't understand "why so many want to read about the world out-of-doors, when it's more interesting simply to go for a walk into the heart of it." The theme that most interested Abbey was that of the struggle for personal liberty against the totalitarian techno-industrial state, with wilderness being the backdrop in which this struggle took place. Most of Abbey's writing criticizes the park services and American society for its reliance on motor vehicles and technology. He wanted to preserve the wilderness as a refuge for humans and believed that modernization was making us forget what was truly important in life.

Regarding his writing style, Abbey states: "I write in a deliberately provocative and outrageous manner because I like to startle people. I hope to wake up people. I have no desire to simply soothe or please. I would rather risk making people angry than putting them to sleep. And I try to write in a style that's entertaining as well as provocative. It's hard for me to stay serious for more than half a page at a time." Abbey felt that it was the duty of all authors to "speak the truth—especially unpopular truth. Especially truth that offends the powerful, the rich, the well-established, the traditional, the mythic".

Abbey's abrasiveness, opposition to anthropocentrism, and outspoken writings made him the object of much controversy. Agrarian author Wendell Berry claimed that Abbey was regularly criticized by mainstream environmental groups because Abbey often advocated controversial positions that were very different from those which environmentalists were commonly expected to hold.

Abbey has also drawn criticism for what some regard as his racist and sexist views. In an essay called "Immigration and Liberal Taboos", collected in his 1988 book One Life at a Time, Please, Abbey expressed his opposition to immigration ("legal or illegal, from any source") into the United States: "(I)t occurs to some of us that perhaps ever-continuing industrial and population growth is not the true road to human happiness, that simple gross quantitative increase of this kind creates only more pain, dislocation, confusion and misery. In which case it might be wise for us as American citizens to consider calling a halt to the mass influx of even more millions of hungry, ignorant, unskilled, and culturally-morally-generically impoverished people. At least until we have brought our own affairs into order. Especially when these uninvited millions bring with them an alien mode of life which—let us be honest about this—is not appealing to the majority of Americans. Why not? Because we prefer democratic government, for one thing; because we still hope for an open, spacious, uncrowded, and beautiful—yes, beautiful!—society, for another. The alternative, in the squalor, cruelty, and corruption of Latin America, is plain for all to see."

It is often stated that Abbey's works played a significant role in precipitating the creation of Earth First!. The Monkey Wrench Gang inspired environmentalists frustrated with mainstream environmentalist groups and what they saw as unacceptable compromises. Earth First! was formed as a result in 1980, advocating eco-sabotage or "monkeywrenching." Although Abbey never officially joined the group, he became associated with many of its members, and occasionally wrote for the organization

Works

Fiction
 Jonathan Troy (1954)
 The Brave Cowboy (1956)
 Fire on the Mountain (1962)
 Black Sun (1971)
 The Monkey Wrench Gang (1975)
 Good News (1980)
 The Fool's Progress (1988)
 Hayduke Lives! (1990)
 Earth Apples: The Poetry of Edward Abbey (1994)

Non-fiction
 Anarchism and the Morality of Violence (1959) (Thesis for master's degree in philosophy from the University of New Mexico)
 Desert Solitaire: A Season in the Wilderness (1968)
 Appalachian Wilderness (1970)
 Slickrock (1971)
 Cactus Country The American Wilderness/Time-Life books  (1973)
 The Journey Home (1977)
 The Hidden Canyon (1977)
 Abbey's Road (1979)
 Desert Images (1979)
 Down the River (with Henry Thoreau & Other Friends) (1982)
 In Praise of Mountain Lions (1984)
 Beyond the Wall (1984)
 One Life at a Time, Please (1988)
 A Voice Crying in the Wilderness: Notes from a Secret Journal (1989)
 Confessions of a Barbarian: Selections from the Journals of Edward Abbey, 1951–1989 (1994)

Letters
 Cactus Chronicles  published by Orion Magazine, Jul–Aug 2006 (no longer active,)
 Postcards from Ed: Dispatches and Salvos from an American Iconoclast (2006)

Anthologies
 Slumgullion Stew: An Edward Abbey Reader (1984)
 The Best of Edward Abbey (1984)
 The Serpents of Paradise: A Reader (1995)

See also
 Ecodefense: A Field Guide to Monkeywrenching (foreword written by Edward Abbey)

References

Further reading
 
 Becher, Anne, and Joseph Richey, American Environmental Leaders: From Colonial Times to the Present (2 vol, 2nd ed. 2008) vol 1 online p. 3

External links

 AbbeyWeb – information about Edward Abbey and his books
 Western American Literature: Edward Abbey
 
 
 
 
 
 
  – includes a photo of Abbey's gravestone
 Edward Abbey papers, 1954–1980
 Edward Abbey audio collection, 1981–1989
 FBI files on Edward Abbey

1927 births
1989 deaths
20th-century American essayists
20th-century American male writers
20th-century American novelists
Alumni of the University of Edinburgh
American environmentalists
American conservationists
American male essayists
American male novelists
American nature writers
American non-fiction environmental writers
Environmental fiction writers
National Park Service personnel
Novelists from Pennsylvania
People from Indiana, Pennsylvania
United States Army personnel of World War II
University of New Mexico alumni